Pardon My Backfire is a 1953 short subject directed by Jules White starring American slapstick comedy team The Three Stooges (Moe Howard, Larry Fine and Shemp Howard). It is the 149th entry in the series released by Columbia Pictures starring the comedians, who released 190 shorts for the studio between 1934 and 1959.

Plot
The Stooges are auto mechanics who need money in order to marry their sweethearts. While working in their auto garage, some escaped convicts pull in with a damaged fender. While the trio are working on the vehicle, they hear a news flash over the radio about some escaped convicts. They put the pieces together and realize that the baddies are right in their garage. The boys capture the crooks, collect the reward, and marry their sweethearts.

Cast

Credited
 Moe Howard as Moe
 Larry Fine as Larry
 Shemp Howard as Shemp
 Benny Rubin as Charles
 Frank Sully as Algernon
 Phil Arnold as Shiv

Uncredited
 Fred Kelsey as Father
 Barbara Bartay as Gun moll
 Diana Darrin as Bettie
 Angela Stevens as Hettie
 Ruth Godfrey as  Nettie
 Blackie Whiteford as first Policeman
 Leonard Kening as second Policeman
 Jules White as Radio announcer

Production notes
Pardon My Backfire was the second and last short made by Columbia with the Stooges in 3D, the previous being Spooks! (released June 15). Pardon My Backfire premiered on August 15, 1953 with the 3D Columbia western The Stranger Wore a Gun starring Randolph Scott and featuring Lee Marvin and Ernest Borgnine.

Like its predecessor, Pardon My Backfire took five full days to complete filming due to the complexity of shots and angles required for 3D viewing. New Stooge films produced at the time generally took no more than three days to complete, with remakes usually being completed in a single day.

This is the third and final Stooge short with the words "pardon my" in the title.

This was also the last Stooge short featuring longtime supporting actor Fred Kelsey.

During the dinner scene, the song heard on the record is Oh! Susanna.

References

External links 
 
 
Pardon My Backfire at threestooges.net

1953 films
1953 comedy films
The Three Stooges films
American black-and-white films
American 3D films
Films directed by Jules White
1953 3D films
3D short films
Columbia Pictures short films
American comedy short films
1950s English-language films
1950s American films